Timber Ridge is a mountain ridge of the Ridge-and-valley Appalachians straddling the U.S. states of Virginia and West Virginia. Timber Ridge extends from the forks of Sleepy Creek at Stotlers Crossroads in Morgan County, West Virginia, to Lehew in Hampshire County, West Virginia. The ridge is predominantly forested, as its name suggests, with the exception of a number of orchards and open fields. From WV 127/VA 127 at Good to Lehew, Timber Ridge serves as the boundary line between Hampshire County, West Virginia, and Frederick County, Virginia.

Summits and knobs
Although Timber Ridge is a continuous mountain ridge, it is made up of a number of summits and knobs with individual names. These include:
 Chine Spring Knob, 1,312 feet (400 m)

Landforms of Frederick County, Virginia
Ridges of Hampshire County, West Virginia
Ridges of Morgan County, West Virginia
Ridges of Virginia
Ridges of West Virginia
Northwestern Turnpike